The 1973 NC State Wolfpack football team represented North Carolina State University during the 1973 NCAA Division I football season. The Wolfpack were led by second-year head coach Lou Holtz and played their home games at Carter Stadium in Raleigh, North Carolina. They competed as members of the Atlantic Coast Conference, winning the conference with a perfect 6–0 record. The Wolfpack were invited to the 1973 Liberty Bowl, where they defeated Kansas.

Schedule

References

NC State
NC State Wolfpack football seasons
Atlantic Coast Conference football champion seasons
Liberty Bowl champion seasons
NC State Wolfpack football